The 2020 Kilkenny Intermediate Hurling Championship was the 56th staging of the Kilkenny Intermediate Hurling Championship since its establishment by the Kilkenny County Board in 1929. The championship began on 29 August 2020 and ended on 26 September 2020.

On 26 September 2020, Lisdowney won the championship after a 4–3 victory in a penalty shoot-out against Thomastown in the final at UMPC Nowlan Park. It was their first ever championship title.

Team changes

To Championship

Promoted from the Kilkenny Junior Hurling Championship
 O'Loughlin Gaels

Relegated from the Kilkenny Senior Hurling Championship
 St. Patrick's Ballyragget

From Championship

Promoted to the Kilkenny Senior Hurling Championship
 Tullaroan

Relegated to the Kilkenny Junior Hurling Championship
 Tullogher-Rosbercon

Results

First round

Relegation playoffs

Quarter-finals

Semi-finals

Final

References

External links
 2020 Kilkenny IHC fixtures

Kilkenny Intermediate Hurling Championship
Kilkenny Intermediate Hurling Championship